Slade on Stage is the third live album by the British rock band Slade. It was recorded at Newcastle City Hall on 18 December 1981 and released almost a year later on 11 December 1982. The album, produced by the band, reached No. 58 in the UK.

Background
Following Slade's performance at the Reading festival in 1980, interest in the band was revived and a major record deal with RCA signed. During the tour to promote the band's 1981 album Til Deaf Do Us Part, the band decided to record their concert at Newcastle City Hall on the RAK mobile. Produced and mixed at Portland Studios in London, Slade on Stage was released in December 1982 and reached No. 58 in the UK.

Speaking to Kerrang! in 1982, Holder said of the album:

Critical reception

At the time of release, reviews were overall positive. Kerrang! described the album as featuring "10 gems" and urged readers to "go out and buy it now". They added: "Watching Slade live is one of the most exhilarating experiences known to mankind. Its a completely over the top manic and raucous package, delivered at a pace that makes even Kiss seem like old men." Sounds praised Slade on Stage as a "sensational album" that "goes some way towards demonstrating just why they're one of the best live rock bands in the world". Describing the album as "one of the livest you'll ever hear in your life", they concluded: "What Slade have always been about is undiluted rock 'n' roll, and this album comes nearer to capturing the feel, the excitement and the sheer energy they generate than anything they've ever attempted before."

AllMusic retrospectively described the album as a "monster", stating: "Believe it or not, Slade on Stage is the most intense recording Slade has ever made. That's heavy. This live album shows the band playing faster, harder, and better than ever. The first three songs set the stage. Slade comes out of the gate so fast that if they didn't follow those three up with a ballad, you'd almost have to take the record off. It's that intense. This is the tightest, hardest, and best you will ever hear Slade (or just about any other hard rock band) play. The material is the cream of the crop, and the recording is a killer. This album's only downside is that it only has nine real songs."

Track listing
All songs written by Noddy Holder and Jim Lea except "You'll Never Walk Alone" by Rodgers and Hammerstein.

Personnel
Slade
Noddy Holder - lead vocals, rhythm guitar, producer
Dave Hill - lead guitar, backing vocals, producer
Jim Lea - bass, backing vocals, producer
Don Powell - drums, producer

Additional personnel
Dave Garland - engineer
George Peckham - cutting engineer
Mike Robinson - mixing
Andrew Christian - sleeve design
Colin Newman - album title
Partridge Rushton - typography

Chart performance

References

1982 live albums
Slade live albums
RCA Records live albums
Albums produced by Noddy Holder
Albums produced by Jim Lea
Albums produced by Dave Hill
Albums produced by Don Powell